Nooth may refer to:

 Louise van der Nooth (1630s–1654), maid of honour of Queen Christina of Sweden
 John Mervin Nooth (1737–1828), English physician, scientist, and army officer
 Charlotte Nooth, Irish poet
 Lord Nooth, a fictional character from the film Early Man